The 78th Oregon Legislative Assembly convened beginning on , for the first of its two regular sessions.

The Democratic Party of Oregon expanded its majority in the Senate to 18–12 and its majority in the House to 35–25. Oregon was the only state where Democrats made net gains in both legislative chambers in the 2014 midterm elections.

Senate 
Based on the results of the 2014 elections, the Oregon State Senate is composed of 18 Democrats and 12 Republicans.

Senate members 

The Oregon State Senate is composed of 18 Democrats and 12 Republicans. Democrats picked up Districts 8 and 15 in the 2014 elections for a net gain of two seats.

Senate President: Peter Courtney (D–11 Salem)
President Pro Tem: Ginny Burdick (D–18 Portland)
Majority Leader: Diane Rosenbaum (D–21 Portland)
Minority Leader: Ted Ferrioli (R–30 John Day)

House members 

Based on the results of the 2014 elections, the Oregon House of Representatives is composed of 35 Democrats and 25 Republicans. Democrats won District 20, which was previously Republican-held, while Republicans picked up no additional seats.

Speaker: Tina Kotek (D–44 Portland)
Majority Leader: Val Hoyle (D–14 Eugene)
Minority Leader: Mike McLane (R–55 Powell Butte)

See also 
 Oregon legislative elections, 2014

References

External links 
 Chronology of regular legislative sessions from the Oregon Blue Book
 Chronology of special legislative sessions from the Blue Book

Oregon legislative sessions
2015 in Oregon
2016 in Oregon
2015 U.S. legislative sessions
2016 U.S. legislative sessions